George Sherwood Hume  (March 1, 1893 – November 24, 1965) was a Canadian geologist.

Born in Milton, Ontario, Hume was a graduate of the University of Toronto. After serving in World War I, he received a PhD from Yale University in 1920. He joined the Geological Survey of Canada and became its Chief in 1947. He was later Director-General of Scientific Services in the Department of Mines and Resources. After retiring in 1956, he worked at Westcoast Transmission in Calgary.

He was president of the Geological Association of Canada from 1952 to 1953, president of the Royal Society of Canada from 1955 to 1956, and president of the Geological Society of America from 1956 to 1957.

He was a Freemason and a member of Civil Service Lodge No. 148 in Ottawa, Ontario, Canada.

References
 University of Calgary Libraries Special Collections Division Occasional Paper No. 10
 

1893 births
1965 deaths
20th-century Canadian geologists
Geological Survey of Canada personnel
Fellows of the Royal Society of Canada
Canadian Officers of the Order of the British Empire
People from Milton, Ontario
University of Toronto alumni
Yale University alumni
Presidents of the Geological Society of America